WRWC may refer to:

WRWB-FM, a radio station (93.3 FM) licensed to serve Ellenville, New York, United States, which held the call sign WRWC from 2006 to 2009
WGFB, a radio station (103.1 FM) licensed to serve Rockton, Illinois, United States, which held the call sign WRWC from 1967 to 2000
Women's Rugby World Cup
Women's Rugby League World Cup